Les Burdett served as the curator of the Adelaide Oval until 2010. He has also been hired to advise other international cricket grounds on the preparation of cricket pitches.

Adelaide-born Burdett joined South Australian Cricket Association in 1969 and he graduated to head curator by 1978.

Burdett announced his retirement on 5 February 2010.

References

Cricket curators
Living people
Year of birth missing (living people)
Place of birth missing (living people)